Fresh Hits 96 is a compilation album released in 1996. As a part of the Hits compilation series, it contains UK hit singles from the first half of 1996. The album reached number 2 on the UK compilations chart.

Track listing

Disc one
 Fugees - "Killing Me Softly (Album Version without intro)"
 Los del Río - "Macarena (Bayside Boys Mix)"
 Mark Morrison - "Crazy (Phil Chill Radio Edit)"
 Peter Andre - "Mysterious Girl (Radio Edit)"
 Ant & Dec - "Better Watch Out (Radio Edit)"
 The Tony Rich Project - "Nobody Knows"
 Toni Braxton - "You're Makin' Me High (Radio Edit)"
 Celine Dion - "Because You Loved Me"
 Simply Red - "We're in This Together"
 Baddiel and Skinner and The Lightning Seeds - "Three Lions"
 Backstreet Boys - "We've Got It Goin' On (Radio Edit)"
 Louise - "Naked"
 George Michael - "Freedom! '90"
 Everything but the Girl - "Walking Wounded"
 Livin' Joy - "Don't Stop Movin' (Radio Mix)"
 Eternal - "Good Thing"
 Robert Miles - "Fable (Dream Radio)"
 DJ Dado - "The X-Files (Radio Edit)"
 De'Lacy - "That Look"
 Alison Limerick - "Where Love Lives (Dancing Divas '96 Radio Edit)"
 Apollo 440 - "Krupa (@440 Edit)"
 Underworld - "Born Slippy"

Disc two
 Manic Street Preachers - "A Design for Life"
 Ash - "Oh Yeah"
 Kula Shaker - "Tattva"
 Suede - "Trash"
 Ocean Colour Scene - "The Day We Caught the Train"
 Sleeper - "Sale of the Century"
 Oasis - "Champagne Supernova"
 The Presidents of the United States of America - "Peaches"
 Lush - "500 (Shake Baby Shake)"
 Space - "Female of the Species (Radio Edit)"
 3T - "24/7 (Radio Edit)"
 Lighthouse Family - "Lifted
 M-Beat featuring Jamiroquai - "Do U Know Where You're Coming From (Original Mix)"
 Busta Rhymes - "Woo-Hah!! Got You All in Check (Album Radio Edit)"
 Bone Thugs-n-Harmony - "Tha Crossroads (D.J. U-neek's Mo Thug Remix)"
 SWV - "You're the One"
 R. Kelly - "I Can't Sleep Baby (If I) (Radio Edit)"
 The Divine Comedy - "Something for the Weekend
 Robson & Jerome - "Daydream Believer"

External links
 Discogs entry for Fresh Hits 96

1996 compilation albums
Hits (compilation series) albums